Asha Patil (1936 – 18 January 2016) was an Indian actress of Marathi film, television and theatre. Regarded among the finest stage and film actresses of her times, Asha Patil was mostly known for portraying character roles of the Marathi Mother. She became famous for playing the character of "Aaye" (Mother) for veteran actor late Dada Kondke, including Tumcha Amcha Jamala, Bot Lavin Titha Gudgulya, Ram Ram Gangaram, Vajvu Ka, Palva palvi and Sasarch Dhotar.

Filmography

Films

 Antaricha Diwa (1960)
 Chandal Choukadi  (1961)
 Manasala Pankha Astat  (1961)
 Shahir Parshuram (1962)
 Rangalya Ratri Asha  (1962)
 Sant Nivrutti Dnyandev (1964)
 Kamapurata Mama  (1965)
 Sadhi Manasa  (1965)
 Preeti Vivah (1981)
 Samna (1974)
 Karava Tasa Bharav (1975)
 Soyarik (1975)
 Tumcha Aamcha Jamala  (1978)
 Bot Lavin Tithe Gudgulya (1978)
 Sasurwashin (1978)
 Banya Bapu  (1977)
 Ram Ram Gangaram  (1977)
 Padarachya Sawalit (1977)
 Sulavarachi Poli (1979)
 Mantryachi Sun (1980)
 Utavala Navara (1989)
 Gavran Gangu (1989)
 Palva Palvi (1990)
 Shubha Bol Narya (1990)
 Maherchi Sadi (1991)
 Sasarcha Dhotar (1994)
 Putravati (1996)
 Vajavu ka 
 Ghe Bharari (2008)
 Maherchi Pahuni

Play & Role
 To Mi Navhech (1962)
 Ekach Pyala (1976)

See also
Marathi cinema

References 

2016 deaths
Marathi actors
Actresses in Marathi cinema
Actresses from Mumbai
20th-century Indian actresses
1936 births
Indian film actresses
Indian stage actresses